Patrick Healy, Pat Healy, Patrick Healey  or  Pat Healey may refer to:

 Felix Healy (Patrick Joseph Healy, born 1955), former Northern Irish football player and manager
 Pat Healy (actor) (born 1971), American actor, writer, and director 
 Pat Healey (born 1985), American soccer player 
 Pat Healy (fighter) (born 1983), American mixed martial arts fighter
 Pat Healy (hurler) (1938–1970), Cork hurler
 Pat Healy, character in the film There's Something About Mary
 Pat Healy, character in the film WarGames
 Patrick Francis Healy (1830–1910), African American Jesuit and President of Georgetown University
 Patrick Healey Jr. (born 1968), American ten-pin bowler
 Patrick Healy (judge), Quebec judge